Miroslav Chvíla (born 28 March 1967) is a former footballer who played international football for both Czechoslovakia and Slovakia. He played as a defender for Dukla Banská Bystrica, Slovan Bratislava and Artmedia Petržalka.

References

External links

1967 births
Living people
Czechoslovak footballers
Czechoslovakia international footballers
Slovak footballers
Slovakia international footballers
Dual internationalists (football)
FK Dukla Banská Bystrica players
ŠK Slovan Bratislava players
FC Petržalka players
Association football defenders